Lawrence C. "Kangaroo Pete" Kaarsberg (August 6, 1876 – January 25, 1943) was a baseball player and an American football player and coach. He served as the head football coach at the University of Oregon in 1900, compiling a record of 3–3–1. Kaarsberg was a college athlete at the University of California, Berkeley, playing football and baseball. Kaarsberg died on January 25, 1943, at Vallejo General Hospital in Vallejo, California, after a heart attack.

Head coaching record

References

External links
 

1876 births
1943 deaths
19th-century players of American football
American football fullbacks
California Golden Bears football players
California Golden Bears baseball players
Oregon Ducks football coaches
Players of American football from California
Baseball players from California